Jean-Baptiste Anouilh, C.M. (Chinese: 董若翰) (1819–1869) was a Catholic prelate who served as the first Vicar Apostolic of Southwestern Chi-Li (1858–1869), Coadjutor Vicar Apostolic of Peking (1848–1858), and Titular Bishop of Abydus (1848–1858).

Biography
Jean-Baptiste Anouilh was born in Prat-Bonrepaux, France and ordained a priest in the Congregation of the Mission on Oct 1847. On 28 Mar 1848, he was appointed during the papacy of Pope Pius IX as Titular Bishop of Abydus and Coadjutor Vicar Apostolic of Peking. On 22 Jun 1851, he was consecrated bishop by Joseph-Martial Mouly, Titular Bishop of Fussala. On 14 Dec 1858, he was appointed during the papacy of Pope Pius IX as Vicar Apostolic of Southwestern Chi-Li. He served as Vicar Apostolic of Southwestern Chi-Li until his death on 18 Feb 1869.

References

19th-century French Roman Catholic priests
19th-century Roman Catholic bishops in China
Bishops appointed by Pope Pius IX
1819 births
1869 deaths
French expatriates in China
French Roman Catholic bishops in Asia
Vincentian bishops
People from Ariège (department)